The women's welterweight is a competition featured at the 2013 World Taekwondo Championships, and was held at the Exhibition Center of Puebla in Puebla, Mexico on July 17. Welterweights were limited to a maximum of 67 kilograms in body mass.

Medalists

Results
DQ — Won by disqualification

Final

Top half

Bottom half

References
Entry List
Draw
Results
Results Book Pages 788–818

Women's 67
Worl